Dance Central 3 is the third game in the Dance Central series. It was revealed at E3 2012 at the Microsoft Conference. It was released on October 16 in the US, Canada and South America and October 19 everywhere else.

Gameplay
Gameplay has been the same with the past 2 Dance Central games where 1 player or 2 players mimic what the dancer is doing on the screen. Player(s) get points depending on how they did.

Many new features have been added to this game.

Crew Throwdown: In this mode, 2-8 players go head to head against each other. After making this picture pose, they go head in head where it will pick a song and one of the 5 types of modes to play it in. Those modes are:

Perform: Aligned with the Perform mode included in the game

Keep The Beat: A freestyle-esque mini-game where players stay in beat to the song for points.

Strike A Pose: A mini-game where players mimic the positions the characters are doing for points.

Story

The player receives an invitation to an underground dance party. When the player's swag is verified Rasa and Lima welcome the player to "the party." It begins with a dance to Bass Down Low, in which upon successful completion the party's secret is revealed that it's Dance Central Intelligence (DCI) and they want to recruit the player to be an agent. To prove the player's skills Rasa and Lima tests the player to Sexy and I Know It. After passing it, they intercept a transmission from Dr. Tan revealing that "Project Lockstep" has reached its second phase. Rasa and Lima explain to the player that they sent various crews back in time to learn the dance crazes of various dance eras for use against Dr. Tan. Furthermore, Dare and Maccoy (who are also DCI agents) are revealed to have gone missing.

Before being sent away via DCI's time machine, the player learns that to return from the past and back to the present, they need to power Boomy the time-traveling boombox, by constant motion - that is dancing. The player is then brought to the '70s in a skate park, where Lu$h Crew is located. Angel is having a good time in the era, however, Miss Aubrey dislikes it heavily because her hair is feathered and the stage smells like hotdogs, just as she won't stop complaining about it. As such, they study the dance craze to learn it is the Hustle. Upon completion, they all return to the present, much to Miss Aubrey's relief (where she insists to be taken to a stylist at once) and Angel's disappointment. Just in, DCI informs the player that Dr. Tan's armies are spreading like a virus, and DCI seems to be the only safe place left.

The player travels back to the '80s to learn its dance craze with Hi-Def. On meeting, Glitch in the name of Hi-Def wanted to challenge the player to a dance-off but was reminded of his duties by Rasa. Glitch laments that if they returned to the present, the street they are currently performing in will get demolished, only to be debunked by Mo who knows Glitch is reluctant to return as he fears getting motion-sickness from time traveling. The player alongside Hi-Def subsequently learns the dance craze; the Electric Slide. Returning to the present, a motion-sick Glitch is escorted away by Mo to rest.

Rasa and Lima inform the player that Dare and MacCoy were found but were under mind control, thanks to a head device Dr. Tan used on his army. While Lima has the mind control device analyzed by the computer to find out any countermeasures, Rasa instructs the player on their next objective. The player is now headed to the '90s where Flash4wrd is having a house party (at their childhood home).

Welcomed by Flash4wrd, Taye and Lil' T had so much fun that they ended up coming with a new dance craze called the House Party but were scolded by Lima for disrespecting the time-space continuum. Afterward, they dance to learn the dance craze of the era revealed to be the Macarena. Once they return to DCI headquarters, Dr. Tan has breached the security system. Lil' T mistakes it as a consequence of she and Taye's messing of the house they were in, but Taye rebukes her, saying that Lil' T had not been born yet.

With a threatening video message from Dr. Tan directed to DCI, Rasa and Lima have the player hurry to the 2000s era to get Bodie and Emilia of Riptide back. The player ends up in a studio where Riptide is hosting a show called Dance Central Live. Riptide is unwilling to go back in the present since the show is currently in mid-season. After which they receive a transmission from Rasa that the DCI headquarters is under attack but the transmission was cut off. Realizing the mission was more important, Riptide and the player race to study the dance craze, revealed to be the Cupid Shuffle.

Back in the DCI headquarters, DCI has gone into silence and emptiness. Bodie and Emilia get taken away in the darkness forcefully, wherein the player receives a transmission from Dr. Tan that he has sent the dance crews to the pre-historic era where he claims dinosaurs have taken care of them (depicted in a childish drawing). He then commands the mind-controlled Rasa and Lima (wearing the head device) to defeat the player in a dance battle. During the conflict, the computer finishes the analysis of the mind control head device and reveals its weakness: expressive movements or "swag." The player, short-circuiting the head devices with the aforementioned swag, manages to free the agents to which Lima explains that Dr. Tan's flaw is that he "cannot innovate, he can only imitate". With renewed hope, the player is instructed by Rasa to go into the future where Dr. Tan has settled, not without powering Boomy for the trip and learning the dance craze of the 2010s, being the Scream.

Reaching the future in "Tantopia," Dr. Tan revealed that he wants to dominate the future; by controlling everyone's dance actions so he will unify the world under the same dance moves. He brings out two new robots, M.O.C.-78 and M.O.C.-56 (like the last time he revealed D-CYPHER) to challenge the dance crazes learned previously. Not willing to give up after the robots get destroyed, Dr Tan brings out a mind-controlled Oblio (who is revealed to be Dr. Tan's son), hesitates and challenges alongside his son the player to the hardest dance of all: OMG. Eventually, the player succeeds and Oblio breaks free of the mind control head device. Liberated, he questions his father's actions to which Dr. Tan said it was all done for him. Disgusted, Oblio tells the player a way to defeat Dr. Tan -trapping him in the time stream with freestyle dancing, which is Dr. Tan's weakness. With Oblio's advice, the player succeeds in defeating Dr. Tan once and for all and returns to DCI headquarters.

Rasa and Lima commends the player for their actions and have informed that all of the crews (including Dare and MacCoy) have been rescued and the dance world is safe again.

In a post-credits scene, a dark single-lit room is shown with two chairs occupied by the Glitterati. Jaryn marks how the dance world is saved, to which Kerith suggests they start some trouble for DCI.

Master Quests
Once the player completes the Story mode, Master Quests becomes available. It gives out all the songs each crew is defaulted for in Dance Central 3, and once the player earns all the stars within each quest, a QR Code image is released for players to scan and receive art of the crews, however this has since been unavailable. Scanning the codes redirect to the main site.

Soundtrack

Songs
The following 46 songs appear on the Dance Central 3 disc.

Importable content

Players can import songs from Dance Central 2 for a set price. If a physical disc is used to perform the import function, the user will also need the unique code from the game's manual; however, if a Games on Demand version of Dance Central 2 is used, then no export code is required.

The import of the original Dance Central songs was previously possible with the same method and for the same price as for Dance Central 2, but since October 25, 2016, new import purchases are no longer possible (old purchases remain intact). If the user has previously imported the original Dance Central into Dance Central 2, it is also available in Dance Central 3.

Downloadable content

All previous downloadable songs are forward compatible with Dance Central 3; however, any new content released on or after October 16, 2012 is only compatible with Dance Central 3.

On March 8, 2013, Harmonix announced that new DLC releases for Dance Central 3 ended after March due to the company shifting its resources to next generation projects.

Notes

References

External links
 

2012 video games
Dance video games
Kinect games
Music video games
Video games about time travel
Video game sequels
Video games developed in the United States
Xbox 360 games
Xbox 360-only games
Harmonix games
Multiplayer and single-player video games